Area codes 732 and 848 are telephone area codes in the North American Numbering Plan (NANP) for parts of the U.S. state of New Jersey.

History
In the original configuration of the first nationwide telephone numbering plan of 1947, all of New Jersey was a single numbering plan area (NPA), assigned the first of all area codes, 201. By 1959, it was split to create a second numbering plan area, 609.
This division generally followed the dividing line between North Jersey, proximate to New York City, and South Jersey, proximate to Philadelphia and the Jersey Shore.
 Despite the division into two numbering plan areas, all calls within the state of New Jersey were dialed without area codes until July 21, 1963.

This configuration of two area code in New Jersey remained in place for c. 33 years, until 1991, when the 201 numbering plan area was further divided to create area code 908 in its southern half. This made available more central office prefixes in the northern part, comprising the densely populated western suburbs of New York City, as well as in the Newark, NJ area, which fell into NPA 908.

On June 1, 1997, services growth in numbering plan area 908 required splitting the area with a new area code 732 assigned to its southeastern half, along the Atlantic seaboard. Ten-digit dialing became mandatory on December 6 of that year. The area includes Middlesex, Somerset, and Union counties in Northern and Central New Jersey, and Monmouth and northern Ocean counties on the New Jersey Shore.

The assignment of area code 848 to the same numbering plan area in 2001 created an overlay plan for this region as the pool of 732-numbers began to diminish drastically.

The area of 732/848, other than Union County, generally defines the Central New Jersey region while 609/640/856 and Area code 908/201/551/862/973 generally mark Southern New Jersey and Northern New Jersey, respectively.

See also
Jersey Shore
North Jersey

References

External links

732
732
732